Strezinja (fl. 1075–1089) was an 11th-century župan of Bribir, and a known member of the Šubić noble family (later the Zrinski's). At one point, he is mentioned with a retinue of five knights, which indicates private armies in service of župan's. He was in a land dispute with the abbot of the Benedictine monastery of Saint John the Evangelist in the city of Biograd, which was eventually resolved by king Demetrius Zvonimir in Nin. He is later mentioned as part of the retinue of king Stephen II.

See also
Šubić family tree

References

External links
Matica.hr
Bribirski knezovi do konca 14 stoljeća

11th-century Croatian people
Medieval Croatian nobility
11th-century Croatian nobility